Bilić is a Croatian, Serbian and Bosnian surname.

The most common etymology is that it is derived either from the word bilo, meaning "white" in Ikavian.

It is among the most common surnames in the Split-Dalmatia County.

Notable people with the surname include:

 Cvitko Bilić (born 1943), Croatian cyclist
 Danira Bilić (born 1969), Croatian basketball player
 Joško Bilić (born 1974), Croatian football player
 Jure Bilić (1922-2006), Croatian politician
 Karlo Bilić (born 1993), Croatian footballer
 Marco Bilić (born c. 1939), Bosnian-Croatian football manager and former player
 Marijan Bilić, Croatian footballer
 Mate Bilić (born 1980), Croatian football player
 Mirjana Bilić (born 1936), Serbian gymnast
 Slaven Bilić (born 1968), Croatian football player
 Zvonimir Bilić (born 1971), Croatian handball player and coach

See also
Belić, surname
Bijelić, surname
Balić, surname
Bolić, surname
Bulić, surname

References

Croatian surnames
Serbian surnames
Bosnian surnames